Crabwalk, published in Germany in 2002 as Im Krebsgang, is a novel by Danzig-born German author Günter Grass. As in earlier works, Grass concerns himself with the effects of the past on the present; he interweaves various strands and combines fact and fiction. While the murder of Wilhelm Gustloff by David Frankfurter and the sinking of the ship the Wilhelm Gustloff are real events, the fictional members of the Pokriefke family bring these events into our own time.

Title
The title, Crabwalk, defined by Grass as "scuttling backward to move forward," refers to both the necessary reference to various events, some occurring at the same time, the same events that would lead to the eventual disaster. Crabwalk might also imply a more abstract backward glance at history, in order to allow a people to move forward. The protagonist's awkward relationships with his mother and his estranged son, explored via the crabbed process of scouring the wreckage of history for therapeutic insight, lends appropriateness to the title.

Plot summary

The narrator of the novella is the journalist Paul Pokriefke, who was born on 30 January 1945 on the day that the Strength Through Joy ship, the Wilhelm Gustloff, was sunk. His young mother-to-be, Tulla Pokriefke (born in Danzig, and already known to readers from two parts of the Danzig Trilogy, Cat and Mouse and Dog Years), found herself among the more than 10,000 passengers on the ship and was among those saved when it went down. According to Tulla, Paul was born at the moment the ship sank, on board the torpedo boat which had rescued them. His life is heavily influenced by these circumstances, above all because his mother Tulla continually urges him to fulfill his 'duty' and to commemorate the event in writing.

In the course of his research, the narrator discovers by chance that his estranged son Konrad (Konny) has also developed an interest in the sinking of the Wilhem Gustloff as a result of Tulla's influence. On his website ('blutzeuge.de') he explores the murder of Wilhelm Gustloff and the sinking of the ship, in part through a dialogue in which he adopts the role of Gustloff, and that of David Frankfurter is taken by another young man, Wolfgang Stremplin.

The two eventually meet in Schwerin, Konny's and Gustloff's hometown. The meeting takes place on 20 April 1997, a date full of symbolism as Hitler was born on 20 April 1889.. Wolfgang, though not Jewish, projects a Jewish persona. He spits three times on the former memorial to Gustloff, thus desecrating it in Konny's eyes. Konny shoots him dead, mirroring the shooting of Gustloff by Frankfurter; after the deed he hands himself in to the police and states that, "I shot because I am a German"; Frankfurter had said, "I shot because I am a Jew".

The narrator is eventually forced to realise that his imprisoned son has himself become a new martyr, and is celebrated as such by neo-Nazis on the Internet.

Characters

Konrad Pokriefke

Konrad (known as "Konny") is the son of Paul Pokriefke and Gabi; after his parents' divorce, Konny is brought up by his left-wing mother and has little contact with his father. Highly intelligent, he is characterised as a 'loner' by his parents. He has a very good relationship with Tulla, who tells him stories of the ship, and with whom he eventually goes to live. Via his website he forms a love-hate relationship with Wolfgang: divided by their political views, they are nevertheless connected by similar characters and a love for table-tennis. At his trial he claims that he has nothing against Jews themselves, but that he considers their presence among Aryan populations to be a 'foreign body'; his father considers that he has a 'slow-burning' hatred for the Jews.

Tulla Pokriefke

Tulla (short form of Ursula) is short, thin, white-haired since the sinking of the ship, and attractive to men even into old age. Politically she is difficult to classify, except as an extremist: on the one hand she repeatedly praises the 'classless society' of the Strength Through Joy ship and supports her grandson even after the murder; on the other hand, she becomes a model functionary of the Socialist Unity Party of Germany in East Germany, weeping on the news of Joseph Stalin's death.

Tulla speaks with a strong accent (a form of Low German described by the narrator as 'Langfursch', after the part of Danzig she is from). As someone who represents a line of continuity with Pokriefke's family's lost Heimat of Danzig and well as the "lost world" of the Kashubian people, whom she is descended from, she has mysterious and almost magical powers of persuasion. Several critics see Tulla as a siren type of character with the power to tempt other people, especially men over to her views.

For her, the cruise ship Wilhelm Gustloff, built in 1937 to put the Volksgemeinschaft (people's community) into practice by allowing ordinary Germans to take free vacations abroad, was a floating utopia where for a brief moment a "classless" society existed where everyone was loved and cared for. Most Germans could not afford a vacation abroad in the interwar period owing to the undervalued Reichsmark, so a voyage aboard the ship was considered to be a great privilege. After the ship was launched, a number of German families who were considered Volksgenossen ("National Comrades"-i.e people who belonged to the Volksgemeinschaft) were allowed to take a free vacation aboard the Wilhelm Gustloff. The people selected for a voyage on the ship were never Gemeinschaftsfremde ("Community Aliens", i.e those who not belong to the Volksgemeinschaft). The Volksgenossen families selected were meant to provide a good cross-section of German society with families who were working class and middle class; Catholic and Protestant; and from northern and southern Germany all sailing together on the ship to provide proof that German society under the Nazi regime had indeed become one. For Tulla, the ideal of the Volksgemeinschaft with German society becoming a gigantic extended family of sorts where everyone was loved and happy is her ideal society, which for her was achieved with the Wilhelm Gustloff. 

The fact that people considered to be Gemeinschaftsfremde were excluded from the Volksgemeinschaft does not seem to be relevant to her way of thinking. Tulla's views are those of the "Hitler Youth generation" who came of age in the 1930s who remembered their youth as a blissful and happy time, and often seemed not to understand why others had more jaundiced and unhappy memories of the period. Thus, she moans not only the loss of life that resulted when the Wilhelm Gustloff went down on the night of 30 January 1945, but also what the ship represented. Somehow paradoxically, she also sees East Germany as another model of her favorite utopian society where everyone was alleged to be loved and cared for, albeit not as strongly as her feelings for what the Wilhelm Gustloff was said to represent.

She seeks at every opportunity to put the story of the ship into the public domain, because it was the subject of silence for so long. When her attempts to persuade her son to write about the disaster fail, she turns her attention instead to her grandson. She also supplies Konny with the weapon which he uses in the murder, after he is threatened by neo-Nazi skinheads.

The old one

The mysterious figure of the old one stands between Grass and the narrator Paul. Belonging to the generation of those who fled west after the end of the war, he encourages Paul to write of the sinking as a substitute for his own failure to do so. The narrator refers to him as his "employer" or "boss". The possibility of identifying him with Grass serves to prevent the equation of the narrator with the author.

Analysis
The message of the novel is essentially that by ignoring the subject of German suffering in World War Two as exemplified by the sinking of the Wilhelm Gustloff gives a platform for political extremists, and that the best way to reduce their appeal is to incorporate events such as the sinking of the Wilhelm Gustloff into the popular memory of the past. Notably, Paul Pokriefke, the narrator of Crabwalk does not like to talk about the sinking of the Wilhelm Gustloff and only opens up about the subject when he discovers a neo-Nazi website that uses the sinking as a way to glorify the Third Reich. The critic Stephen Brase felt that the main theme of the novel was parental failure as Paul together with his ex-wife Gabi are unable to prevent their son from becoming a Nazi. Brase saw the characters of Paul and Gabi as emblematic of the post-war generation who came of age in the 1960s who wanted to create a better Germany, but were unable to make lastingly positive changes. Grass portrayed Paul as well meaning, but unable to make the changes he wants because for the first half of the novel he cannot speak of the sinking of the Wilhelm Gustloff. Even when Paul does speak of the sinking, he stresses that some of the aspects of the sinking such as the fate of the passengers in the interior of the ship who were unable to escape as the ship went down too rapidly into the icy waters of the Baltic sea are simply too horrible to put into words. In a different way, the parents of Wolfgang Stremplin are also shown as having failed as Stremplin's philo-Semitism-which is deeply heartfelt as the result of guilt over the Holocaust-but is also portrayed as being more than a little silly and absurd. The novel ends on a grim note as the last lines are: "It doesn't end. It will never end". 

In a critical 2002 review in Die Zeit, Thomas Schmitt rejected Grass's thesis of a "national taboo" about the memory of German victimization in the war, noting that the families of Germans who fled or were expelled after the war kept alive the memories of their lost homelands and that conservative German historians have always written much about the subject. However, Schmitt did accept that there were aspects of recent German history that made it difficult to incorporate the memory of German victimization into the memory of the past. Schmitt noted that the "68ers" as the generation who came of age in the late 1960s are known tended to point an accusing finger at their parents and grandparents for all the things that they did and did not do in the Nazi era, and thus were and still are adverse to accepting the image of their parents/grandparents as victims. Schmitt further pointed out that the cause of expellees were championed by the West German government under Konrad Adenauer, which rejected the Oder-Neisse line, but the Ostpolitik of Willy Brandt and the acceptance of the Oder-Neisse line in 1970 led to the West German state disallowing the expellees and their demands for the "right to a homeland". Schmitt noted that the expellee groups hurt their cause by their demands for a revanchist foreign policy aiming to take back parts of Poland that had once belonged to Germany, making the memory of their suffering difficult to incorporate into the memory of the past in a way that would be acceptable. For all these reasons, Schmitt felt that Crabwalk had come too late, and felt that it was unlikely to change the memory of the past in the way that Grass wanted. Through Schmitt felt that the sinking of the Wilhelm Gustloff was indeed a terrible tragedy, he felt that some might draw too rash a conclusion, noting that on the day after the Wilhelm Gustloff went down, a death march ended in the same area. The SS forced the inmates of the Stutthof concentration camp outside of Danzig onto a death march that at ended with the survivors who reached the Baltic being shot down into the crashing waves. Schmitt noted that however terrible the sinking of the Wilhelm Gustloff was-being the largest number of people being lost at sea in a single sinking ever-that the ship was carrying military personnel and weapons, making it a legitimate target for the Soviet submarine that sank it under international law (through it could argued that the sinking was morally wrong as the majority of the people aboard the ship were civilians), while the Stutthof death march was an act of genocide. Schmitt argued that through it was terrible the loss of life that resulted when the Wilhelm Gustloff went down, that the sinking of the ship was not an act of genocide and should not be remembered in that way. 

Grass was one of the "Flakhelfer generation", namely those Germans under the Third Reich who were too young to be drafted into the Wehrmacht, but were usually assigned as gunner assistants to the Luftwaffe anti-aircraft batteries that were used against the Allied bombers during the strategical bombing offensive. One critic of the novel, Fritz J. Raddatz, one of the leaders of the student protests of the late 1960s, stated in a 2006 interview that Grass was too harsh towards the "68ers" in Crabwalk, stating that Grass's portrayal of all their efforts to change German society as a failure was most unfair. Raddatz argued that the picture of the novel of the "68ers" as well meaning, but ineffectual intellectuals who cannot banish fascism because of their own considerable flaws was a distorted one, which reflected Grass's disapproval of the protest movements of the 1960s.

Many reviewers felt that the "spectacular success" of Crabwalk would lead to a new national discourse that would place the image of Germans as victims of the war as the dominant memory of the past. The German journalist Ralph Giordano, who suffered persecution in the Nazi era for having a Jewish mother, called Crabwalk one of Grass's best novels, and wrote that Grass was correct that events such as the sinking of the Wilhelm Gustloff should be remembered and moaned as a terrible chapter of the war. However, Giordano insisted it should never be forgotten that it was the war began by Germany in 1939 that led to the expulsions of the Germans from Poland and elsewhere in Eastern Europe, noting that the 1950 charter of the main expellee group was an "instrument perfectly suited for repressing historical facts" as it gave the impression that it was Poland that attacked Germany in 1939. Giordano argued that Grass's intentions in Crabwalk were honorable, but his argument could be easily be distorted into a picture of moral equivalence with there being no differences between the actions of the Axis and Allied states-a way of remembering the past that Giordano was vehemently against.. The critic Siegfrid Mews wrote that there was much to Giardano's concerns, noting that British reviewers of Crabwalk praised the novel for its attention to the "forgotten victims of ethnic cleansing" and the "sense of loss" that the novel embraced was a sign of the growing "normalisation of Germany". In a review in the conservative Daily Telegraph, much was made about the "9, 000 people who died [on the Wilhelm Gustloff]-six times more than in the Titanic disaster-were largely ignored by the country's literacy elite and to an extent by the historians". Mews noted that many of the British reviewers seemed to embrace the novel's message that story of German victimisation in the war should be part of the memory of the past in a manner that seemed to be contrary to Grass's intentions.'

The British critic Julian Preece noted in Crabwalk that the sinking becomes a symbol for Der Flucht ("The Flight")-the massive, chaotic and catastrophic flight of Germans from the eastern parts of Germany in the winter of 1944-1945 as the Red Army advanced into the Reich towards Berlin. Through Grass does note that there were soldiers abroad the Wilhelm Gustloff, he also notes that the majority of those who went down with the ship were civilians and that Captain Alexander Marinesko of the Soviet submarine S-13 had no reason to believe that the cruise ship was anything other than a civilian ship when he torpedoed it, thus making the sinking unjustified in his view. In the novel, Grass notes that the story of the sinking was forbidden in East Germany, which he compares with the way that the subject of German victimization in the war had become increasingly taboo in West Germany since the Brandt era. Much of the novel concerns Paul Pokriefke's attempts to sort out the various meanings attached to the sinking, including also the Soviet viewpoint as Pokriefke traces the story of Captain Marinesko who found himself imprisoned in a Siberian Gulag camp after the war. Through the novel condemns Marinesko, he is not depicted as normally he is in German accounts as a monster who heartlessly sent some 9, 600 people to their deaths by sinking the ship, instead being portrayed as both a perpetrator and a victim, providing a degree of moral ambiguity. 

Notably, the sinking of the Wilhelm Gustloff is not presented as a complete story of German victimization as the book correctly notes that the three captains commanding the ship were criminally negligent in not having enough lifeboats aboard while the decision to keep the ship's lights on at night, thereby illuminating the ship's profile against the dark sky, has never been explained. Had the Wilhelm Gustloff had the proper number of lifeboats, more lives would have been saved while if the lights had been turned off, the ship might very well had escaped been sunk altogether. The evaluation of the ship was likewise botched with the children aboard the Wilhelm Gustloff mostly going down with the ship while the three captains all managed to find themselves places on the lifeboats, aspects of the sinking that are incorporated into the novel. Preece felt that the most vivid parts of Crabwalk were the "death in the snow" segments tracing the real story of Der Flucht as millions of German civilians trekked westwards in vast panic-stricken columns over the snow and ice in the winter of 1944-45 with many dropping dead on their epic flight. Preece wrote the debate about the assassination of Wilhelm Gustloff in Switzerland which takes up much of the novel was "...really a distraction from the horror in the snow experienced by the refugees in the winter treks to the west, which claimed the lives of so many in such degrading circumstances".

The South African novelist J.M Coetzee felt that the character of Tulla was Grass's most memorable character who despite her questionable political views is undeniably a victim as she speaks moving of the sinking of the Wilhelm Gustloff, saying: "A thing like that you can never forget. It never leaves you. It's not just in my dreams, that cry [of passengers drowning in the Baltic] that spread over the waters...And of them little children among the ice floes". Coetzee stated that Tulla's politics may be "ugly" and "unrefined", but were "deeply felt" as he wrote that Grass made an "considered argument" that people such as Tulla should be allowed "to have their heroes and martyrs and memorials and ceremonies of remembrance" as repression of any kind leads to "unpredictable consequences".

References
 Crabwalk. Transl. from the German by Krishna Winston. Orlando; Austin; New York; San Diego; Toronto; London: Harcourt: 2002.

Notes

2002 German novels
Novels by Günter Grass